Kojiro Shinohara (篠原 弘次郎, born July 20, 1991) is a Japanese football player for Matsumoto Yamaga FC.

Club statistics
Updated to end of 2018 season.

References

External links
Profile at Avispa Fukuoka

1991 births
Living people
Association football people from Saga Prefecture
Japanese footballers
J2 League players
J3 League players
Fagiano Okayama players
Roasso Kumamoto players
Avispa Fukuoka players
Matsumoto Yamaga FC players
Association football defenders